Johnny Doyle (born 1957) is an Irish former hurler.  At club level he played with Holycross–Ballycahill and was also a member of the Tipperary senior hurling team. He usually lined out as a corner-back.

Honours

Holycross–Ballycahill
Tipperary Senior Hurling Championship: 1990
Mid Tipperary Senior Hurling Championship: 1978, 1985, 1989, 1990, 1991

Tipperary
National Hurling League: 1978-79
Munster Under-21 Hurling Championship: 1978]
Munster Minor Hurling Championship: 1973

References

External link

 Johnny Doyle profile on Tipp GAA Archives website

1957 births
Living people
Holycross-Ballycahill hurlers
Tipperary inter-county hurlers